The 1901 Northern Maori by-election was a by-election for the seat of Northern Maori during the 14th New Zealand Parliament. The election was held on 9 January 1901.

The sitting member Hone Heke Ngapua was declared bankrupt and had to resign from the seat.

However following the precedent of Sir Joseph Ward in 1897 (see 1897 Awarua by-election) he was eligible to stand in the resulting by-election.

He won the by-election with a substantial majority.

Results
The following table gives the election results:

References

Northern Maori 1901
1901 elections in New Zealand
Māori politics